The 1964–65 Duke Blue Devils men's basketball team represented Duke University in the 1964–65 NCAA Division I men's basketball season. The head coach was Vic Bubas and the team finished the season with an overall record of 20–5 and did not qualify for the NCAA tournament.

References 

Duke Blue Devils men's basketball seasons
Duke
1964 in sports in North Carolina
1965 in sports in North Carolina